Adam L. Peterson (born May 18, 1979) is a former pitcher in Major League Baseball.

Peterson was traded by the Blue Jays to the Arizona Diamondbacks on January 12, 2005, in exchange for Shea Hillenbrand. The Diamondbacks placed him on waivers, and he was claimed by the Detroit Tigers.

External links

1979 births
Living people
American expatriate baseball players in Canada
Auburn Doubledays players
Baseball players from Savannah, Georgia
Dunedin Blue Jays players
Erie SeaWolves players
Major League Baseball pitchers
New Haven Ravens players
Syracuse SkyChiefs players
Toronto Blue Jays players
Tucson Sidewinders players
Wichita State Shockers baseball players
Anchorage Glacier Pilots players